Mowbray Cricket Club (MCC), also known as Mowbray Eagles is a cricket team which represents the Launceston suburb of Mowbray in the Northern Tasmanian Cricket Association grade cricket competition, in the Australian state of Tasmania.

The Mowbray cricket club has a history of nurturing outstanding Tasmanian talent including Australian representatives, Ricky Ponting and Greg Campbell, and well as Tasmanian Tigers players Richard Soule and Troy Cooley.

Mowbray CC was the first club in NTCA history to win Premierships from 1st to 4th grade in a single season.

Honours 
NTCA Premierships:

External links
 MCC Website

References

Tasmanian grade cricket clubs
Sport in Launceston, Tasmania